Empire Girls: Julissa and Adrienne is an American reality television series that premiered on the Style Network on June 3, 2012. The series follows the lives of rising Latina stars and best friends Julissa Bermudez and Adrienne Bailon as they try to get their big breaks in the entertainment industry.

Background
Julissa and Adrienne met on the set of the 2006 film All You've Got, where they become fast friends to the point of sharing Adrienne's larger trailer. Since then, they have supported each other through trials and tribulations in life and love. Julissa has hosted several programs for young adults on networks like MTV, BET, and more, including shows like 106 & Park and The Jersey Shore Aftershow. Her ultimate goal is to be a major talk show personality, like Oprah Winfrey. Adrienne has had success as a singer for pop groups 3LW and The Cheetah Girls, as well as an actress. Adrienne's inspiration is Jennifer Lopez, and solidifying her solo singing career is her primary objective. In addition to their career aspirations, the girls are eager to find the right guy to settle down with. Both have high profile exes in the world of sports and entertainment, and try to put their romantic pasts behind them.

Cast

Main
 Julissa Bermudez
 Adrienne Bailon

Recurring
 Ashley Weatherspoon
 Layla Kayleigh
 Angie Martinez
 Claudette Bailon Alexander
 Jorge Santos

Episodes

References

External links

2010s American reality television series
2012 American television series debuts
2012 American television series endings
English-language television shows
Style Network original programming